John Christopher Heagarty is an American politician. He was appointed by Governor Bev Perdue to serve in the North Carolina House of Representatives in 2009 to fill the vacancy created by the resignation of Rep. Ty Harrell, a fellow Democrat. Heagarty represented the 41st House district in western Wake County.

A long-time resident of Wake County, Heagarty attended York Elementary School and William G. Enloe High School.  He graduated from North Carolina State University with a Bachelor of Arts in multi-disciplinary studies with a concentration in political communications.

Heagarty lobbied at the North Carolina General Assembly for the NC Association of Electric Cooperatives Inc. He next served as executive director and lobbyist for the non-partisan North Carolina Center for Voter Education from 2000 until he left in 2007 to pursue a J.D. degree from North Carolina Central University.

Morrisville Councilman Tom Murry defeated Heagarty in the 2010 general election by a 54-46% margin.  After his loss, Heagarty went on to head the North Carolina Judicial Standards Commission and the City of Oaks Foundation, a land conservancy.

Upon the death and posthumous re-election of Wake County School Board member Kathy Hartenstine, Heagarty applied to be appointed to the position.  As he was the only contender for the District 7 seat, he was chosen to serve on the school board. He was elected to a full term on the board in 2020.

Electoral history

2020

2010

References

External links
Campaign site

Living people
Year of birth missing (living people)
People from Raleigh, North Carolina
William G. Enloe High School alumni
21st-century American politicians
Democratic Party members of the North Carolina House of Representatives